Pojuca is a municipality in the state of Bahia in the North-East region of Brazil.

Pojuca is the birthplace of mixed martial artist and current UFC Women's Featherweight Champion and two-time Women's Bantamweight Champion Amanda Nunes.

Localities
 

Miranga

See also
List of municipalities in Bahia

References

Municipalities in Bahia